KRVK (107.9 FM) is a commercial radio station licensed to Vista West, Wyoming, broadcasting to the Casper, Wyoming area. KRVK airs an adult hits music format branded as "Jack FM". When the station first signed on in 1998, it was broadcasting on 107.7 FM. KRVK is owned and operated by Townsquare Media.

Former logo

External links
Official Website

RVK
Radio stations established in 1998
1998 establishments in Wyoming
Townsquare Media radio stations
Casper, Wyoming
Adult hits radio stations in the United States
Jack FM stations